Eneicat–RBH Global–Martín Villa is a professional cycling team which competes in elite road bicycle racing events such as the UCI Women's World Tour. The team was established in 2018, registering with the UCI for the 2019 season.

Team roster

Major results
2021
Abadiño Cyclo-cross, Alessia Bulleri

2022
Juegos Bolivarianos Road Race, Aranza Villalón
Overall Vuelta a Formosa, Aranza Villalón
Stage 3, Aranza Villalón

National Champions
2019
 Latvia Road Race, Lija Laizāne

2020
 Spain Track (Madison), Eukene Larrarte

2021
 Estonia Road Race, Aidi Tuisk
 Greece Road Race, Varvara Fasoi

2022
 Greece Road Race, Varvara Fasoi
 Estonia Road Race, Aidi Tuisk

References

External links

Cycling teams established in 2018
Cycling teams based in Spain